The Honeymoon Is Over is the third studio album by Australian indie rock band The Cruel Sea, which was released in May 1993. The album was produced by the band, Tony Cohen and Mick Harvey for Red Eye Records. It peaked at No. 4 on the ARIA Albums Chart and has sold over 140,000 copies. Its lead single, "Black Stick" was released ahead of the album in March 1993 and peaked at No. 25 on the related Singles Chart. The title song, "The Honeymoon Is Over", was released in July 1993 as a single and reached the Top 50. It was followed by a cover of Tony Joe White's 1969 song, "Woman with Soul", in October which peaked at No. 64.  The final single from the album, "Seems Twice", was issued in February 1994 and peaked at No. 90.

In 1994, the band won five ARIA Awards: 'Single of the Year' and 'Song of the Year' for "The Honeymoon Is Over"; 'Album of the Year', 'Best Group' and 'Producer of the Year' for The Honeymoon Is Over.
The album’s liner notes details “For Lulamay”, Gormly’s daughter.

Background
The Cruel Sea was formed in late 1987 in Sydney by Jim Elliot on drums and Dan Rumour (aka Daniel Atkins) on guitar. By late 1988, Ken Gormly had joined on bass guitar and James Cruickshank on keyboards and guitars. In 1989, the band invited vocalist Tex Perkins, also a member of Beasts of Bourbon, to join them on-stage. The group signed with Red Eye Records and released their debut album, Down Below, in December. Their second album, This Is Not the Way Home was issued in December 1991.

The Honeymoon Is Over was produced by the band, Tony Cohen (The Birthday Party, Beasts of Bourbon) and Mick Harvey (Robert Forster, Anita Lane) of Nick Cave and the Bad Seeds. Released in May 1993, it peaked at No. 4 on the ARIA Albums Chart, and sold over 140,000 copies.

Late in 1994, the group toured Europe, again supporting Nick Cave and the Bad Seeds. They followed with a headlining tour across Europe and to Canada. On the Triple J Hottest 100, 1993, three tracks from The Honeymoon Is Over appeared, "The Honeymoon Is Over" at No. 9, "Black Stick" (No. 21) and "Delivery Man" (No. 95).

Recording
Perkins said, "We put the album down over three, one-week sessions, which is the longest we've ever taken to do it. If I spend too much time in the studio I get bored — desensitised. It's like I have nothing more to offer. But the actual recording was very easy — it's when you're mixing that it becomes microscopic — studying each sound. That doesn't flow so easily."

Reception

Allmusic's Tom Demalon said the album "blends organic, rootsy instrumentation with clever, well-written lyrics to produce an album that is a joy from start to finish". Randy Krbechek of Metronews was impressed, "[It] is a treat. From the instrumental tracks (such as the North African-influenced "Orleans Stomp" and the pop-rock, "Seems Twice") to rock cuts like "Better Than Love" and "Black Stick", The Cruel Sea delivers the goods".

Reviewed in Rolling Stone Australia at the time of the release, it was said that the album differed from the band's previous releases because of the Cajun feel that permeated the album. Tony Cohen's production was particularly praised. The music was described as, "part Elvis Sun Sessions guitar twang, part Booker T-inspired instrumental groove, part Tom Waits percussive and lyrical growl, and a lot of Southern American country influence à la Tony Joe White's "Polk Salad Annie".

Accolades
At the ARIA Music Awards of 1994, The Cruel Sea won 'Single of the Year' and 'Song of the Year' for "The Honeymoon Is Over", 'Album of the Year', 'Best Group' and 'Producer of the Year' (Tony Cohen) for The Honeymoon Is Over and received five further nominations including 'Best Cover Art' by Kristyna Higgins and Jay Manby. At an after-party, a drunken guest attacked Higgins, a professional photographer, and a fracas ensued with Perkins defending his partner. Also that night, two of their ARIA trophies were stolen.

In October 2010, The Honeymoon Is Over was listed in the book, 100 Best Australian Albums.

Track listing

Charts

Weekly charts

Year-end charts

Certification

Personnel
The Cruel Sea members
Jim Elliott – drums, percussion
Dan Rumour – guitars, percussion
James Cruickshank – keyboards, guitar, backing vocals, percussion
Ken Gormly – bass guitar, percussion
Tex Perkins – vocals, harmonica, guitar

Additional musicians
Geoff Hales – percussion
Ross Hannaford – guitar
Mick Harvey – tambourine, xylophone

Production details
Producer – The Cruel Sea, Tony Cohen, Mick Harvey
Mastering – Don Bartley
Engineer – Tony Cohen
Editing, sequencing – David Macquarie
Studio – Metropolis and Atlantis (Melbourne)
Planet (Perth) – "Black Stick"

Art work
Cover art – Kristyna Higgins, Jan Manby
Cover photo – Kristyna Higgins
Concept – Tex Perkins
Photography – Tex Perkins, Kristyna Higgins

References

External links
The Honeymoon Is Over at Discogs

1993 albums
ARIA Award-winning albums
Albums produced by Tony Cohen
The Cruel Sea (band) albums